The Blasting Room is a recording studio in Fort Collins, Colorado. Founded by members of the punk rock band All in 1994, it is owned and operated by musician Bill Stevenson (Descendents, Black Flag, All, Only Crime) and Jason Livermore. The studio is known for recording and producing many punk rock bands, with Stevenson and Livermore serving as in-house audio engineers and record producers.

In July 1994, the members of All relocated from Brookfield, Missouri to Fort Collins. Using money from their recent recording contract with Interscope Records, they designed and began construction of The Blasting Room with the help of guitarist Stephen Egerton's father, Dan O'
Reilly. The studio opened four months later, featuring a two-inch analog 24-track tape machine, a mixing console manufactured by Solid State Logic, and a variety of outboard gear. The 4,000 square foot facility includes three recording studios: Studio A, the largest, features three isolation booths; The smaller Studio B has a separate control room; Studio C is a mixing and editing suite. In early 2018 The Blasting Room finished renovations that included the addition of a Mastering Suite designed by acoustician John H. Brandt. The Blasting Room also features a lounge, kitchen, and two bedrooms available to visiting artists. In addition to production, engineering, and mixing, the studio also offers audio mastering services done by Livermore.



Albums recorded, mixed, and/or mastered at The Blasting Room

2021 

 Nowhere Generation - Rise Against

2019 
 Love Is a Weapon - Stone & Snow
 Nine Meals - Toxic Bears
 Sangre Fácil - Segismundo Toxicómano

2018 
 The Ghost Note Symphonies Vol. 1 - Rise Against
 Delusional - Bbs Paranoicos

2017 
 Adult Braces [EP] - No Trigger
 Hi Vis High tea - Frenzal Rhomb
 Infrasoinuak - Berri Txarrak

2016 
State Is Burning - Useless ID
Quicksand EP - In the Whale
Protection - Face to Face
Hypercaffium Spazzinate - Descendents
The Revenge of the Fifth - Belvedere
Bad Vibrations - A Day to Remember
Cut the Cord - Batfoot!

2015 
 American Man - The Yawpers
 Tales from Wyoming - Teenage Bottlerocket
 I Am a Rifle (single) - Propagandhi
 Bring It To Life (Side A) - Post Paradise
 Heavy Love - Man Overboard
 F - Kemuri
 Ska Bravo - Kemuri
 Bail - Head Injuries
 Peace in Our Time - Good Riddance
 Dedication - After the Fall

2014 
 Wovenwar - Wovenwar
 The New Sidewalk - Such Gold
 The Black Market - Rise Against
 California (Single) - Reno Divorce
 NOFX: Backstage Passport - NOFX
 Are We Not Men? We Are Diva! - Me First and the Gimme Gimmes
 Hang - Lagwagon
 Rampant - Kemuri
 Denbora Da Poligrafo Bakarra - Berri Txarrak

2013 
Tony Sly Tribute (split) - Teenage Bottlerocket
Tony Sly Tribute (split) - Anti-Flag
Long Forgotten Songs: B-Sides & Covers 2000–2013 - Rise Against
Pursuance - Only Crime
Stoke Extinguisher - NOFX
The Night Ends - My Body Sings Electric
King Cataract - Wire Faces
See the Light - Less Than Jake
All for This! - Kemuri
Revolt EP - Hundredth
Stomp - Big D and the Kids Table
Stroll - Big D and the Kids Table
Tony Sly Tribute - Anti-Flag
My Shame Is True - Alkaline Trio
Partycrasher - A Wilhelm Scream

2012 
 No One Loves You Like I Do - The Life and Times
 Comet - The Bouncing Souls
 Freak Out! - Teenage Bottlerocket
 Diamond - Stick to Your Guns
 Blind - Rise Against
 Lover's Leap - Reno Divorce
 Home - Off with Their Heads
 Self Entitled - NOFX
 Ocean Crest (single) - My Body Sings Electric
 Exister - Hot Water Music
 The Circle in the Square - Flobots
 The Extended Play EP - Darling Thieves
 Comfort/Distraction - Broadway Calls
 Awakened - As I Lay Dying

2011 
 Symptoms - Useless ID
 Endgame - Rise Against
Good for Me - The Swellers
Doctor (single) - My Body Sings Electric
Diamonds & Gold - Wire Faces
Joey Cape's Bad Loud - Joey Cape's Bad Loud
Smoko at the Pet Food Factory - Frenzal Rhomb
The Complete Control Sessions - Anti-Flag
Wonder Age - Air Dubai

2010 
 Survival Story - Flobots
 Only You (single) - Train
 I'm Still Here - Mindy McCready
 Icon - Puddle of Mudd
 The Longest EP - NOFX
 Capricorn One: Singles & Rarities - Good Riddance
 Street Dogs - Street Dogs
 Step Into the Light (single) - My Body Sings Electric

2009 
 The World Outside - Eyes Set to Kill
 Saw VI (soundtrack) - Various artists
 High Speed Access to My Brain - Rehasher
 Supporting Caste - Propagandhi
 Gravity is What You Make It - Chase Long Beach
 Tears Before Breakfast - Reno Divorce
 They Came from the Shadows - Teenage Bottlerocket
 Volume 4: Songs in the Key of Love & Hate - Puddle of Mudd
 Cokie the Clown - NOFX
 We Are All We Have - The Casualties
 Good News, Bad Views - Broadway Calls
 Coaster - NOFX
 I'm Not Gonna Lie To You - The Decline

2008 
 The Lost and Broken Bones - Useless ID
 Remain in Memory: The Final Show - Good Riddance
 IV - Nerf Herder
 I Think My Older Brother Used to Listen to Lagwagon - Lagwagon
 Drunk Like Bible Times - Dear and the Headlights
 You Can't Live This Way - Drag the River
 Nightmare Revisited - Various artists
 Ashes to Ashes - Welt
 Appeal to Reason - Rise Against
 Delicate Situation - Drive By

2007 
 It's Dead, Jim - Warp 11
 Masterpieces: 1991–2002 - Mustard Plug
 Sink or Swim - The Gaslight Anthem
 Guilty Pleasures - Wednesday Night Heroes
 All the Best Songs - No Use for a Name
 Wolfbiker - Evergreen Terrace
 Sustain - Buck-O-Nine
 Blastin! - Kemuri
 I Remember When I Was Pretty - The Playing Favorites
 Nothing is Too Much - Coles Whalen
 Good Guys, Bad Band - Armchair Martian
 Madeline - Tickle Me Pink
 The Feel Good Record of the Year - No Use for a Name
 Career Suicide - A Wilhelm Scream
 Famous - Puddle of Mudd
 In Black and White - Mustard Plug
 Livin' the Dream - Scott Reynolds
 Broadcasting... - Comeback Kid
 Virulence - Only Crime

2006 
 My Pappy Was a Pistol - Filthy Thieving Bastards
 Twelve Small Steps, One Giant Disappointment - Bad Astronaut
 Recovery - Enlow
 The New Seditionaires - Lower Class Brats
 Subverter - The Esoteric
 It's Crazy - Drag the River
 Love Their Country - Me First and the Gimme Gimmes
 Too Late Show - The Lillingtons
 Lemonheads - The Lemonheads
 Under Attack - The Casualties
 The Sufferer & the Witness - Rise Against
 My Republic - Good Riddance
 Wolves in Wolves' Clothing - NOFX
 Nightmerica - Love Equals Death
 Canyoneer - No Trigger
 Never Trust a Hippy - NOFX

2005 
After Dark - Scary Kids Scaring Kids
Naysayers and Yesmen/Laugh Now Cry Later - Reno Divorce
This December; It's One More and I'm Free - Lydia (band)
Resolve - Lagwagon
Lay Waste the Poets - Inked in Blood
Potemkin City Limits - Propagandhi
Tony Hawk's American Wasteland - Various artists
Waiting for the Rain - Kemuri
Our PMA - Kemuri
Ruiner - A Wilhelm Scream
War Profiteering Is Killing Us All - The Suicide Machines
Lords of Dogtown: Music from the Motion Picture - Various artists
Wake the Dead - Comeback Kid
You and Me - Open Hand
Take It Back, Take It On, Take It Over! - 7 Seconds (band)
No Lo Siento - Pink Lincolns
Last Rides of the Midway - Shiver

2004 
Chicken Demos - Drag the River
Hey Buddies... - Drag the River
Left of the Dial: Dispatches from the '80s Underground - Various artists
Rhetoric of Reason - The Code
To the Nines - Only Crime
Lady Melody - Audio Karate
Love Is Worth It - Silent Drive
Mute Print - A Wilhelm Scream
Cool to Be You - Descendents
On the Front Line - The Casualties
'Merican - Descendents

2003 
The Biggest and the Best - Slick Shoes
Punk Goes Acoustic - Various artists
The Terror State - Anti-Flag
...And We Drive - Side Walk Slam
Match and some Gasoline - The Suicide Machines
Bound by Ties of Blood and Affection - Good Riddance
Home Is Where the Hate Is - The Fight (band)
Revolutions per Minute - Rise Against

2002 
 Live at the Starlight - Drag the River
 Cover Ups - Good Riddance
 Give Back - Side Walk Slam
 Ten Years and Running - MxPx
 Closed - Drag the River
 Who Wants to Play Bass? - Armchair Martian
 Live Vol. 1 - The O.C. Supertones

2001 
 Good Riddance / Kill Your Idols - Good Riddance
 Soundtrack for a Generation - Student Rick
 Death Alley - Zeke
 The Shattering - Season to Risk
 Live Plus One - Descendents and ALL
 Past Remains - Side Walk Slam
 Symptoms of a Leveling Spirit - Good Riddance
 Brand New Dream - Welt
 Facing Changes - Hangnail

2000 
 Borders & Boundaries - Less Than Jake
 Ace Troubleshooter - Ace Troubleshooter
 Problematic - ALL
 Wake Up Screaming - Slick Shoes
 Let's Talk About Leftovers - Lagwagon
 Armchair Martian - Armchair Martian
 Phenomenon of Craving - Good Riddance

1999 
 To All Our Fallen Heroes - Ann Beretta
 Before You Were Punk 2: Another Punk Rock Tribute to 80's New Wave - Various artists
 I'm in Love - The Jackie Papers
 Burning Bridges - Ann Beretta
 At the Show - MxPx
 Operation Phoenix - Good Riddance
 Pray for Mojo - Mustard Plug
 All - ALL
 True Crime - Zeke

1998 
Let's Talk About Feelings - Lagwagon
Uckfay Ooyay - The Jackie Papers
Looking Forward to Failure - The Ataris
77 Days - Kemuri
Headcleaner - I Against I
Broke Down - Welt
Mass Nerder - ALL

1997 
Pure Swank - Pink Lincolns
Evildoers Beware! - Mustard Plug
Seeing Things - Shades Apart

1996 
Everything Sucks - Descendents
Super Sound Racing - Zeke
Sturdy - The Lemons
Riviter - Judge Nothing
Rocks for the Jocks - My Name

1995 
Pummel - ALL
...Rocks Your Lame Ass - Hagfish
 onehundredpercentfreak - Alligator Gun

References

External links 
 

Buildings and structures in Fort Collins, Colorado
Recording studios in the United States
Culture of Fort Collins, Colorado